Kilrush Church, also called St. Munchin's Church, is a medieval church and a National Monument in Limerick City, Ireland.

Location

History
The church was built some time in the 10th century, and first appears in records of 1201; it is believed to be oldest building in the city. The window in the south wall is 15th century, from a nearby Franciscan church. It is dedicated to Mainchín mac Setnai, a saint of the late 6th century. It was excavated in 1999; approximately 40 bodies were found buried beneath the Quinlivan window, dating to the 16th or 17th century.

Church
Based on its large stone blocks and lintel, the church is placed to the pre-Norman period. It is rectangular.

References

Religion in Limerick (city)
Archaeological sites in County Limerick
National Monuments in County Limerick
Former churches in the Republic of Ireland